The 1792 United States presidential election in Maryland took place on an unknown date in 1792, as part of the 1792 presidential election. Voters chose eight representatives, or electors to the Electoral College, who voted for President and Vice President.

Early elections were quite different from modern ones. Voters voted for individual electors, who were pledged to vote for certain candidates. Oftentimes, which candidate an elector intended to support was unclear. Prior to the ratification of the 12th amendment, each elector did not distinguish between a vote cast for President and Vice President, and simply cast two votes.

Very little is known about this election. In his book, Presidential Elections in Maryland, Former Maryland Secretary of State John T. Willis writes that voters used the general ticket method and that all of the 898 votes cast were for Washington electors.

Results 

The results from Worcester County are unknown, but it can be assumed Washington got 100% of the vote as he was the only candidate.

Results by county

See also 
 United States presidential elections in Maryland
 1792 United States presidential election
 1792 United States elections

Notes

References 

Maryland
1792
Presidential